1804 in sports describes the year's events in world sport.

Boxing
Events
 English champion Jem Belcher remains inactive after losing an eye in 1803.

Cricket
Events
 Homerton Cricket Club becomes a first-class team (until 1808).
England
 Most runs – Lord Frederick Beauclerk 258 (HS 94)
 Most wickets – Lord Frederick Beauclerk 17

Horse racing
England
 The Derby – Hannibal
 The Oaks – Pelisse
 St Leger Stakes – Sancho

References

 
1804